Uma (known natively as ) is an Austronesian language spoken in Central and South Sulawesi, Indonesia.

Phonology

Consonants

 
Notes:
 
 acts as a nasal in some respects and causes the nasalization of non-front vowels (e.g., [] 'ten'→ with nasal vowels).
 is realized as retroflex  contiguous to non-front vowels.
 is neutralized word-initially, and is the only consonant that can occur in the coda or word-finally.
In the Lincio variety of Central Uma,  is pronounced .
The semivowel  is rare, found mainly in loan words.
The affricate /tʃ/ is found only following /n/, i.e., in the prenasalized stop /ⁿtʃ/.

Orthographic notes:

 is 'w'
 is 'ny'
 is 'ng'
 is 'y'
 is 'j'
 is 'c'
 is an apostrophe or simply 'ʔ'

Vowels

Pronouns

Notes:
ABS refers to pronominals in the absolutive case, while ERG refers to the ergative and GEN to the genitive.
1P means 'first person,' 2P means 'second person,' and 3P means 'third person.'
(SG) means 'singular' and (PL) means 'plural.' (PL.ex) means 'plural exclusive' and (PL.in) means 'plural inclusive.'
[∅-] means that ∅ is a proclitic.
[-∅] means that ∅ is an enclitic.
In the Tobaku, Tolee', and Winatu dialects, the possessives [] and [] are [] and [] respectively.
In the Tolee' and Winatu dialects, the absolutives [] and [] are [] and [] respectively. The free forms [] and [] are [] and [] respectively.

Numerals
The cardinal numbers from 1 to 10 are:

Classification of Uma varieties

Ethnologue (17th ed., 2013) recognizes seven dialects of Uma.

Bana
Benggaulu (= Bingkolu)
Kantewu (= Central Uma)
Aria (= Southern Uma)
Tobaku (= Ompa, Dompa, Western Uma)
Tolee' (= Eastern Uma)
Winatu (= Northern Uma)

Martens (2014) recognized six major dialects of Uma, noting that the Tori'untu dialect is nearly extinct due to the encroachment of the Kantewu dialect and non-Uma languages.

Kantewu (= Central)
Southern
Tolee'
Tobaku
Winatu
Tori'untu

Martens also identifies two dialects closely related to Uma spoken in the Pasangkayu Regency.

Sarudu
Benggaulu (= Bingkolu)

References

Bibliography

 
 

Kaili–Pamona languages
Languages of Sulawesi